De Hoop is a gristmill in Den Hout, Netherlands. The mill was built in 1837. In 1975, the owner sold the mill to the municipality, which had it restored in 1985. It was declared a monument in 1971.

References

Flour mills in the Netherlands
Rijksmonuments in North Brabant
Windmills in North Brabant